Arslan Siddique (born 1996), better known as Arslan Ash, is a Pakistani professional fighting game player of Tekken by Bandai Namco Entertainment. Arslan won the Evo Japan 2019 championship and Evo Championship Series 2019 (at the time becoming the only person to have won both) as well as winning the WePlay Ultimate Fighting League title for Tekken 7. He was awarded the Best E-Player of 2019 by ESPN. He is the CEO 2021 champion. He won the 2022 Combo Breaker Tekken 7 tournament in a landslide, having defeated all 10 of his opponents. Arslan is widely considered one of the best Tekken players in the world, and is largely credited for helping to bring the Pakistani Tekken scene to mainstream attention.

References

1996 births
Living people
Pakistani esports players
People from Lahore
Fighting game players
Tekken players